was a Japanese ichthyologist and professor of zoology at the Imperial University of Tokyo. He published numerous works on fishes and sharks and co-authored a book on Japanese fish with famous American scientist David Starr Jordan.

Publications
Jordan, D. S., S. Tanaka, and J. O. Snyder. 1913. A catalogue of the fishes of Japan. J. Coll. Sci. Imp. Univ. Tokyo, Vol. 33 (article 1): 1–497.

Tribute
The genus Tanakia D. S. Jordan & W. F. Thompson 1914  was named for Tanaka, as an “accomplished” ichthyologist of the Imperial University of Tokyo, who described Tanakia shimazui in 1908 and Pseudorhodeus tanago in 1909.

Taxon described by him
See :Category:Taxa named by Shigeho Tanaka

References

Kochi University Biography(in Japanese)

1878 births
1974 deaths
Japanese ichthyologists